Tokelau national rugby sevens team is a minor national side. At the 2011 Pacific Games they finished in 8th place.

Squad
Squad to the 2011 Pacific Games 
Lamese Pasene
Usi Seu
Lealofi Sasulu
Etuale Tehoa Ioane
Simona Puka
Kosetatino Liufau
Alosio Isaia
Elika Teao
Viliamu Ioapo
Luaao Luapo
Falima Tuumuli
Iona Koloi

2011 Pacific Games

Pool Stages
 12 – 5 
 12 – 5 
 0 – 77

Finals
Quarter-finals
 0 - 26 
5–8th Semifinals
 12 – 19 
7th place
 7 – 33

See also
Tokelau at the 2011 Pacific Games
Rugby union in Tokelau

National rugby sevens teams
R
Rugby union in Tokelau